Francis Girod (9 October 1944 – 19 November 2006) was a French film director, actor, and screenwriter. He directed 20 films between 1974 and 2006. His film L'enfance de l'art was entered into the 1988 Cannes Film Festival. In 1994 he was a member of the jury at the 44th Berlin International Film Festival.

Selected filmography
 Slogan, directed by Pierre Grimblat (1969) - screenwriter, along with Pierre Grimblat and Melvin Van Peebles
  (1974)
 Rene the Cane (1977)
 The Savage State (1978)
 The Lady Banker (1980)
  (1982)
 Le Bon Plaisir (1984)
 Descente Aux Enfers (1986)
 Mon beau-frère a tué ma soeur, directed by Jacques Rouffio (1986) – actor
 L'enfance de l'art (1988)
 Lumière and Company (1995)
 Passage à l'acte (1996)
 Terminale (1998)
  (2006)

References

External links

1944 births
2006 deaths
French film directors
French male film actors
French male screenwriters
Officers of the Ordre national du Mérite
20th-century French screenwriters
20th-century French male actors
20th-century French male writers